Spilaethalida erythrastis is a moth of the family Erebidae. It is found in north-eastern Australia (Queensland).

References

Moths described in 1886
Spilosomina